"Girls Girls Girls" is a song co-written and performed by American pop singer Fletcher; issued as a standalone single on October 8, 2021. The song contains an interpolation of "I Kissed a Girl" as performed by Katy Perry.

Music video

The official music video for "Girls Girls Girls" was directed by Kristen Jan Wong.

Chart positions

References

External links
 
 

 

2021 songs
2021 singles
Capitol Records singles
Fletcher (singer) songs
Lesbian-related songs
Song recordings produced by Kito (musician)
Songs written by Cathy Dennis
Songs written by Fletcher (singer)
Songs written by Jonas W. Karlsson
Songs written by Kito (musician)
Songs written by Madison Love
Songs written by Dr. Luke
Songs written by Max Martin
Songs written by Katy Perry